North Jeolla Province (Jeollabuk-do), also known as Jeonbuk, is a province of South Korea. North Jeolla has a population of 1,869,711 (2015) and has a geographic area of 8,067 km2 (3,115 sq mi) located in the Honam region in the southwest of the Korean Peninsula. North Jeolla borders the provinces of South Jeolla to the south, North Gyeongsang and South Gyeongsang to the east, North Chungcheong to the northeast, and South Chungcheong to the north.

Jeonju is the capital and largest city of North Jeolla, with other major cities including Iksan, Gunsan, and Jeongeup.

North Jeolla was established in 1896 from the province of Jeolla, one of the Eight Provinces of Korea, consisting of the northern half of its mainland territory.

History
During the Proto-Three Kingdoms period, Jeolla region was the center of  the Mahan confederacy among Samhan. There were 15 tribal countries out of 54 in the region. During the period of the Three States, this region came to belong to Baekje when it absorbed Mahan. Baekje was destroyed by the Silla and Chinese Tang dynasty allied force in 660 (20th year of King Uija) and ruled by Tang. It became a part of Silla when Tang was expelled in 676 (16th year of King Munmu).

When there were nine states and five small capitals in Unified Silla in 685, there were Wansan-ju (present Jeonju) and Namwon-gyeong (present Namwon) in Jeollabuk-do in existence.

In 892, when General Gyeon Hwon founded Hubaekje (later Baekje), this area was the center of the country for about 50 years. In 936, during the rule of Singeom, it was attributed to Goryeo Dynasty. From 900 to the time when Hubaekje was attributed to Goryeo, Wansan-ju (present Jeonju) had been its capital, and the country ruled the whole Jeolla-do region.

In 996 (14th year of King Seongjong), this region was named Gangnam province and the Korean government established the four states (Jeonju-Jeonju, Yeongju-Gobu, Sunju-Sunchang, and Maju-Okgu) in the North Jeolla region.

Gangnam-do (Jeonbuk) and Haenam-do (Jeonnam) were combined and titled as Jeolla-do in 1018 (9th year of King Hyeonjong's reign).

During the Joseon Dynasty, as the administrative districts of the whole nation were organized in the Eight Provinces system in 1413 (13th year of King Taejong's reign), Jeolla-do took charge of vast areas of one prefecture, four autonomous counties, four protectorates, 12 counties, and 31 counties covering present Jeollanam-do, Jeollabuk-do and Jeju-do.

In 1896 (33rd year of King Gojong's reign), the whole country was divided into 13 provinces. Jeolla-do was divided into Jeollanam-do and Jeollabuk-do. Jeollabuk-do consisted of 26 counties.During the Japanese colonial periodn, the province became the province of Zenrahoku-dō, which was reverted into the original subdivision in 1945.

In 1963, Geumsan-gun was incorporated into Chungnam, and Wido-myeon of Jeonnam was incorporated into Jeonbuk. Jeongju-eup and Namwon-eup were raised to cities in 1981 and Gimje-eup was raised to city status in 1989. Wansan-gu and Deokjin-gu were established in Jeonju-city in the same year.

Due to establishment of cities in the mixed type of city-farming area in 1995, Okgu, Jeungeup, Namwon, Gimje and Iksan-Guns were combined. Gimje and Iksan-guns were merged and Gunsan, Jeonju, Namwon, Gimje and Iri cities were integrated. Through repeated reorganizations of administrative districts, now the region consists of the administrative districts of six cities and eight counties.

Geography
Jeollabuk-do is in the south-western part of Korea, bordered on the south-eastern by Hadong-gun, Hamyang-gun, and Geochang-gun of Gyeongnam, and Gimcheon-si of Gyeongbuk, Bangyabong Peak of Sobaek Mountain, Toggibong Peak, Myeongseungbong Peak, Baekwoonsan Mountain, Namdeokyusan Mountain, and Muyongsan Mountain, on the south by Yeongwang-gun, Jangseong-gun, Damyang-gun, Gokseong-gun, and Gurye-gun, on the north by Geumsan-gun, Nonsan-si, Buyeo-gun, and Seocheon-gun of Chungnam, and Yeongdong-gun of Chungbuk and on the west by China over the Yellow Sea.

Demographics

Festivals

Jeonju International Sori Festival
Jeonju International Sori Festival is a high-quality worldwide music art festival based on Pansori, Korea's Intangible Cultural Heritage. It is designed to promote Korean music to the world and exchange diverse musical heritages of many nations though sounds as meditation. The festival was selected as one of the "Best 25 International Festivals" by the UK music magazine Songlines in 2012 and 2013.

Jeollabuk-do World Calligraphy Biennale
The Jeollabuk-do World Calligraphy Biennale was launched in favor of popularizing and globalizing Korean calligraphy in 1997. Since then, the art of calligraphy, the quintessence of Chinese character culture in East Asia, has gained global interest among calligraphers and the public over the years.

 Festivals of Jeollabuk

Transportation and industry
In the 1960s the Honam highway (which has been upgraded to the Honam Expressway) was built. This created an industrial belt, connecting the cities of Iri (now called Iksan) and Gunsan (a port city) with the provincial capital of Jeonju.

Public transportation networks serve Jeonju and other cities in Jeollabuk-do including Gunsan Airport.
 Jeju International Airport → Gunsan Airport: twice a day / 50-minute flight
 Gunsan Airport → Jeonju: Airport shuttle service / 1 hour running
 Gunsan intercity bus service for other cities and counties

Education

National Universities with Graduate Schools
Chonbuk National University - Jeonju
Kunsan National University - Gunsan
Jeonju National University of Education - Jeonju

Private Universities with Graduate Schools
Howon University – Gunsan
Jeonju University – Jeonju
Woosuk University – Wanju County, Jeonju Campus
Wonkwang University – Iksan
Won Buddhism Graduate School – Iksan
Yewon Arts University – Imsil County Campus

National Institutes of Higher Education
Korea National College of Agriculture and Fisheries - Jeonju

Private Institutes of Higher Education
Jeonju Kijeon College – Jeonju
Jeonju Technical College - Jeonju
Kunsan College of Nursing - Gunsan
Kunjang College – Gunsan
Paekche Institute of the Arts – Wanju County
Wonkwang Health Science College – Iksan

Religion

According to the census of 2005 of the people of North Jeolla 37.7% follow Christianity (26.3% Protestantism and 11.4% Catholicism) and 12.8% follow Buddhism. 49.5% of the population is mostly not religious or follow Muism and other indigenous religions.

International sisterhood relationships and partnerships
 Sisterhood relationship
  Jiangsu, People's Republic of China (27 October 1994)
  Washington, United States (17 May 1996)
  New Jersey, United States (19 May 2000)
 Partnership
  Kagoshima Prefecture, Japan (30 October 1989)
  Ishikawa Prefecture, Japan (10 September 2001)
  Shanghai, People's Republic of China (17 April 2003)
  Shandong, People's Republic of China (2 November 2006)

Administrative divisions

Tourism

 Jeonju — Jeonju Hanok Village, Jeondong Catholic Church, Gyeonggijeon Shrine, Jeonju Hanji Museum, Royal Portrait Museum, Jeonju Gaeksa, Jeonjuhyanggyo Confucian School, Ajung Lake, Deokjin Park, 
 Namwon — Gwanghallu Pavilion, Chunhyang Theme Park, Manin Cemetery of Righteous Fighters, Silsangsa Temple, Gyoryong Sanseong Fortress
 Gochang — Gochangeupseong Fortress, Seonunsa Temple, Pansori Museum
 Iksan — Mireuksaji Pagoda, Wanggungri Five-story Stone Pagoda
 Gimje — Geumsansa Temple
 Gunsan — Hirotsu House, Dongguksa Temple, Modern History Museum
 Buan — Tapsa Temple, Byeonsanbando National Park
 Imsil County — Imsil Cheese Village

See also
 Jeonbuk Hyundai Motors FC

References

External links
 
  
 North Jeolla Province news
 Travel Information

 
Provinces of South Korea